Stand and Deliver is a 1988 American drama film directed by Ramón Menéndez, written by Menéndez and Tom Musca, based on the true story of a high school mathematics teacher, Jaime Escalante. For portraying Escalante, Edward James Olmos was nominated for the Academy Award for Best Actor at the 61st Academy Awards. The film won the Independent Spirit Award for Best Feature in 1988. The film's title refers to the 1987 Mr. Mister song of the same name, which is also featured in the film's ending credits.

In 2011, the film was selected for preservation in the United States National Film Registry by the Library of Congress as being "culturally, historically, or aesthetically significant".

Plot 

In the early 1980s, Jaime Escalante becomes a mathematics teacher at James A. Garfield High School in East Los Angeles. The school is full of Latino students from working-class families whose academic achievement is far below their grade level. Two students, Angel and another gangster, arrive late and question Escalante's authority. Escalante demonstrates how to multiply numbers using one's fingers and appeals to the students' sense of humor. After class, some gangsters threaten Escalante. After school, he stops the gangsters from fighting. He then introduces himself as a 'one-man gang' with the classroom as his domain. Escalante tells the students that he's decided to teach the students algebra.

At a meeting, Escalante learns that the school's accreditation is under threat, as test scores are not high enough. Escalante says that students will rise to the level that is expected of them. Escalante gives the students a quiz every morning and a new student joins the class. He instructs his class under the philosophy of ganas, roughly translating to "desire".

Escalante tells other faculty that he wants to teach the students calculus. He seeks to change the school culture to help the students excel in academics, as he has seen the untapped potential of his class. Other teachers ridicule him, as the students have not taken the prerequisites. Escalante states that the students can take the prerequisites over the summer. He sets a goal of having the students take Advanced Placement Calculus by their senior year.

The students sign up for the prerequisites over the summer. There is no air conditioning, but Escalante is able to teach the class, giving them oranges and telling them to focus so they can get good jobs and take vacations. In the fall, he gives the students contracts to be signed by the parents; they must come in on Saturdays, show up an hour early to school, and stay until 5pm in order to prepare for the AP Calculus exam.

Two weeks before the students' exam, Escalante is teaching an ESL class to some adults. He suddenly clutches at his torso in pain, stumbles into the hallway, and falls. A substitute teacher is found for the students while Escalante recovers in the hospital, but the substitute teacher is a music teacher. Soon after, Escalante escapes from the hospital and shows up at school to continue teaching. After taking the exam, the students head to the beach and celebrate. All 18 students who took the exam pass it. At a meeting to congratulate the students, a plaque of appreciation is presented to Escalante.

To the dismay of both Escalante and the students, the Educational Testing Service questions the students' exam scores. Escalante finds an anonymous letter of resignation in his school mail and has to walk home that evening, as his car has been stolen from the school parking lot. Dismayed, he confides in his wife that he regrets having taught the students calculus, because they did well but nothing changed for them. The boys of the class show up at Escalante's house; they have fixed up his car as a way to thank him. Escalante meets with the investigators from Educational Testing Service, argues with them, but ultimately offers to have the students retake the test. Despite having only one day to prepare, all the students pass, and Escalante demands that the original scores be resubmitted.

Cast

 Edward James Olmos as Jaime Escalante
 Estelle Harris as Secretary
 Virginia Paris as Raquel Ortega
 Will Gotay as Francisco "Pancho" Garcia
 Ingrid Oliu as Guadalupe "Lupe" Escobar
 Carmen Argenziano as Jesse Molina
 Rosanna DeSoto as Fabiola Escalante
 Vanessa Marquez as Ana Delgado
 Lou Diamond Phillips as Angel Guzman
 Karla Montana as Claudia Camejo
 Lydia Nicole as Rafaela Fuentes
 James Victor as Ana's Father
 Mark Eliot as Armando "Tito" Guitaro
 Patrick Baca as Javier Perales 
 Andy García as Ramirez

Historical accuracy 

The film is accurate in that students in Escalante's class had to retake the test, and all who retook the test passed.

The movie gives the impression that the incident occurred in the second year Escalante was teaching, after students from his first year took a summer session for the calculus prerequisites. In fact, Escalante first began teaching at Garfield High School in 1974 and taught his first Advanced Placement Calculus course in 1978 with a group of 14 students, and it was in 1982 that the exam incident occurred. In the first year (1978), only five students remained in the course at the end of the year, only two of whom passed the AP Calculus exam. Writing in Reason, Jerry Jesness stated, "Unlike the students in the movie, the real Garfield students required years of solid preparation before they could take calculus... So Escalante established a program at East Los Angeles College where students could take those classes in intensive seven-week summer sessions. Escalante and [principal Henry] Gradillas were also instrumental in getting the feeder schools to offer algebra in the eighth and ninth grades." In 1987, 27 percent of all Mexican Americans who scored three or higher on the AP Calculus exam were students at Garfield High.

Escalante himself described the film as "90 percent truth, 10 percent drama". He said that several points were left out of the film. He pointed out that no student who did not know multiplication tables or fractions was ever taught calculus in a single year. Also, he suffered inflammation of the gall bladder, not a heart attack.

Ten of the 1982 students signed waivers to allow the College Board to show their exams to Jay Mathews, the author of Escalante: The Best Teacher in America. Mathews found that nine of them had made "identical silly mistakes" on free response question six. Mathews heard from two of the students that during the exam, a piece of paper had been passed around with that flawed solution. Twelve students, including the nine with the identical mistakes, retook the exam, and most of them received the top four and five scores. Mathews concluded that nine of the students did cheat, but they knew the material and did not need to.

Mathews wrote in the Los Angeles Times that the Ana Delgado character "was the only teenage character in the film based on a real person" and that her name had been changed.

Reception
On the review aggregator website Rotten Tomatoes, the movie holds a score of 90% from 61 reviews. The website's consensus reads, "Stand and Deliver pulls off the unlikely feat of making math class the stuff of underdog drama -- and pays rousing tribute to a real-life inspirational figure in the bargain." Metacritic has given the film a score of 77 out of 100 based on 11 reviews, indicating "generally favorable reviews".

Accolades

Legacy
In December 2011, Stand and Deliver was deemed "culturally, historically, or aesthetically significant" by the United States Library of Congress and selected for preservation in the National Film Registry. The Registry said the film was "one of the most popular of a new wave of narrative feature films produced in the 1980s by Latino filmmakers" and that it "celebrates in a direct, approachable, and impactful way, values of self-betterment through hard work and power through knowledge."

The film is recognized by the American Film Institute as #86 on its 2006 AFI's 100 Years...100 Cheers list.

In 2016, the United States Postal Service issued a 1st Class Forever "Jaime Escalante" stamp to honor "the East Los Angeles teacher whose inspirational methods led supposedly 'unteachable' high school students to master calculus."

See also
 1988 in film
 AFI's 100 Years... 100 Cheers
 List of American films of 1988
 Mathematics education in the United States

References

External links

 
 
 
 

1988 films
1988 drama films
1988 independent films
1988 directorial debut films
1980s coming-of-age drama films
Hispanic and Latino American drama films
American biographical drama films
American coming-of-age drama films
American high school films
American independent films
Films about mathematics
Films about race and ethnicity
Films directed by Ramón Menéndez
Drama films based on actual events
Films scored by Craig Safan
Films set in Los Angeles
Films set in 1982
Independent Spirit Award for Best Film winners
Films about Mexican Americans
United States National Film Registry films
Biographical films about mathematicians
Biographical films about educators
American Playhouse
1980s English-language films
1980s American films